The filmography of American actor Sam Elliott includes nearly 100 credits in both film and television. He came to prominence for his portrayal of gruff cowboy characters in Western films and TV series, making early minor appearances in The Way West (1967) and Butch Cassidy and the Sundance Kid (1969). He went on to appear in several horror films, such as Frogs (1972) and The Legacy (1978), and appeared in various television series. His film breakthrough was the drama Mask (1985), in which he co-starred with Cher. In 1989, he starred in the Christmas movie Prancer, playing a widowed apple farmer whose daughter finds an injured reindeer and tends to it in the belief it is one of Santa's. The 1989 film Road House also featured Elliott. 

He would reprise his Western image in 1991's television film Conagher, for which he earned a Golden Globe nomination for Best Actor, followed by his role portraying Virgil Earp in Tombstone (1993). He also appeared in Gettysburg (1993), in which he played Brigadier General John Buford. He earned his second Golden Globe nomination for his supporting portrayal of Wild Bill Hickok in the miniseries Buffalo Girls (1995). He had a minor role in the comedy The Big Lebowski (1998), and later had supporting roles in the fantasy The Golden Compass (2007) and the drama Up in the Air (2009).

From 2016 until its ending in 2020, Elliott began portraying Beau Bennett on the Netflix series The Ranch. He subsequently appeared in a supporting role in the musical drama A Star Is Born (2018) directed by and co-starring Bradley Cooper, which earned him a National Board of Review Award for Best Supporting Actor and various nominations, including an Academy Award for Best Supporting Actor nomination and a Screen Actors Guild Award nomination for Outstanding Performance by a Male Actor in a Supporting Role.

Film

Television

See also

External links

References

Male actor filmographies
American filmographies